General Sir Hew Whitefoord Dalrymple, 1st Baronet (3 December 1750 – 9 April 1830) was a Scottish general in the British Army and Governor of Gibraltar.

Early life
Dalrymple was the only son of Captain John Dalrymple, of the 6th Dragoons and his second wife, Mary, née Ross (c.1719–1793). Following his father's death in 1753, Dalrymple's mother married Sir James Adolphus Oughton.

Military career
Dalrymple was commissioned as an ensign into the 31st Regiment of Foot in 1763, was promoted Lieutenant in 1766 and Captain in 1768. He took time out from the Army to study at the University of Edinburgh from 1767 to 1768. Dalrymple was knighted in 1779 thanks to the influence of his family.

Lieutenant-Colonel of the 68th Foot in 1781, he was promoted to Colonel when he transferred to the 1st Foot Guards. In 1793 he commanded a composite battalion of grenadiers in Lake's brigade under York in the Flanders Campaign, and saw action at Raismes 8 May, Famars 23 May, the Siege of Valenciennes 13 June – 28 July, and the Siege of Dunkirk 25 August – 10 September. He returned to Britain early in 1794 and was made Major-General on 3 October. 

In 1796, he was appointed Lieutenant Governor of Guernsey. He became Colonel of the 81st Regiment of Foot (Loyal Lincoln Volunteers) in 1797, transferred to the 37th (North Hampshire) Regiment of Foot in 1798 and to the Green Howards in 1810.

On 1 January 1801 he was promoted Lieutenant-General and from 1802 to 1806 was General Officer Commanding Northern District. In 1806, he was posted to Gibraltar to serve under Lt-General Fox. After Fox's departure he was made Acting Governor of Gibraltar, replacing Gordon Drummond, November 1806 – August 1808.

In 1808, he was appointed Commander of the Portuguese Expedition, landing on 22 August after Junot's defeat at Vimiero to replace Wellesley and Burrard. He immediately halted Wellesley's pursuit of the beaten French to Lisbon. Lacking either confidence or intelligence, or both, on 31 August Dalrymple signed a truce with Junot allowing him to return to France in British ships with all his weapons, men and loot. 

This infamous truce, known as the Convention of Cintra, was denounced both in London and in Portugal. Dalrymple sailed for home to face an enquiry 4 October, and never held a field command again.

Sir John Moore, Dalrymple's replacement in Portugal, said he "was never able to determine on any point whatever". "Sir Hew, having never had the experience of command, seems quite at a loss how to work with the different heads of department; the troops suffer".

Made Colonel of the 57th (West Middlesex) Regiment in 1811, he was promoted General on 1 January 1812 through seniority. He was also made Governor of Blackness Castle in 1818.

Miscellaneous
He was nicknamed "Dowager" by the army.
Dalrymple was played by John Woodvine, in the 1999 Hornblower (TV series) episode, The Duchess and the Devil.
Dalrymple features prominently as the governor of Gibraltar and commander in Portugal  in books 20 and 21 of Dewey Lambdin's Alan Lewrie series of Naval fiction.

Family
In 1783 he married Frances, daughter of General Francis Leighton, and together they had three daughters and two sons.

References

External links

Napoleonic Guide
The Gentlemans Magazine

|-
 

|-

|-

|-

 

1750 births
1830 deaths
37th Regiment of Foot officers
81st Regiment of Foot officers
Baronets in the Baronetage of the United Kingdom
British Army generals
British Army personnel of the French Revolutionary Wars
British Army commanders of the Napoleonic Wars
Governors of Gibraltar
Green Howards officers
Grenadier Guards officers
Alumni of the University of Edinburgh
People from Ayr